Vučurović is a Montenegrin and Serbian surname. It may refer to:

Maja Vučurović (born 1991), Serbian female basketballer
Nikola Vučurović (born 1980), Montenegrin basketballer

Serbian surnames
Montenegrin surnames